The following is the list of International Sports Persons from the Indian State of Tamil Nadu:

2016 Summer Olympics - Rio 2016
  Satish Sivalingam - Weightlifting,
  Arokia Rajiv - 4 x 400 m Relay,
  Ayyasamy Dharun -  4 x 400 m Relay,
  Sharath Kamal - Table Tennis,
  Krishnan Ganapathi - 20 km Walk,
  Mohan Kumar - Track and Field

2016 Summer Paralympics - Rio 2016

Athletics
 Rajasekaran Pichaya
 Santhi Soundarajan
 Kumaravel Premkumar
 Nikhil Chittarasu

Table Tennis
 Sathiyan Gnanasekaran
 Sharath Kamal
Achanta Sharath Kamal (born 12 July 1982) is a professional Table Tennis player from Tamil Nadu, India. Sathiyan Gnanasekaran is the highest ever ranked Indian in the world.

International Achievements

Tennis
All grand slam and highest singles ranking by an Indian are achieved by the players from Tamil Nadu. Ramanathan Krishnan reached semi finals of grand slam twice. His son Ramesh Krishnan reached grand slam quarters thrice and have beaten then World No 1 player Matts Wilander in the Australian open. Vijay Amritraj have reached quarter finals of grand slams fours times and have won 18 ATP singles career titles. Mahesh Bhupathi have won 12 grand slams titles for doubles and mixed doubles.

 Ramanathan Krishnan
 Ramesh Krishnan
 Vijay Amritraj
 Anand Amritraj
 Mahesh Bhupathi
 Prajnesh Gunneswaran
 Ramkumar Ramanathan
 Jeevan Nedunchezhiyan
 Vijay Sundar Prashanth
 N. Sriram Balaji
 Prakash Amritraj

Chess
 Viswanathan Anand

Carrom
 A. Maria Irudayam
 S. Ilavazhagi

Hockey
 Vasudevan Baskaran
He captained the Indian team, which won the gold medal at the 1980 Summer Olympics in Moscow, Soviet Union.

Motor racing
 Narain Karthikeyan
 Sundaram Karivardhan
 Ajith Kumar
 Parthiva Sureshwaren
 Karun Chandhok

Swimming
 Kutraleeswaran
 Niranjan

Squash
 Joshna Chinappa
 Dipika Pallikal

International Achievements

Skating
 Nethra

Weightlifting
 Sathish Sivalingam

International Achievements 
Commonwealth Games

Commonwealth Championships

References

Tamil Nadu, List of sportspeople
Sportspeople